Francisco Javier Flores Sequera (born April 30, 1990) is a Venezuelan footballer who plays as a defensive midfielder. He was born in Barquisimeto and plays for Carabobo FC and Venezuela national team.

Club career
Senna began his career with Maximo Viloria FC. In 2006, he signed with Guaros FC and later in 2009 with ACD Lara playing for 5 years and reaching the rank of club captain.  On 30 June 2011, he joined Deportivo Anzoátegui

International career
Flores has played five times for the Under-20 national team in Venezuela, scoring a goal, in addition to participating in the achievement of the classification to the Egypt U-20 World Cup, in 2009. He was also the captain of the Venezuela team the past season.

International goals
Scores and results list Venezuela's goal tally first.

References

External links

1990 births
Living people
Sportspeople from Barquisimeto
Venezuelan footballers
Venezuelan expatriate footballers
Asociación Civil Deportivo Lara players
Deportivo Anzoátegui players
Deportivo Táchira F.C. players
A.C.C.D. Mineros de Guayana players
Independiente Medellín footballers
Venezuelan Primera División players
Categoría Primera A players
Venezuela international footballers
Footballers at the 2007 Pan American Games
Association football midfielders
Venezuelan expatriate sportspeople in Colombia
Expatriate footballers in Colombia
Pan American Games competitors for Venezuela
Guaros F.C. players
21st-century Venezuelan people